Anomotherium is an extinct genus of manatee that lived in the shallow seas of what is now northern Germany. Its closest relative is Miosiren. Fossils of the genus have been found in the Bohlen and Doberg Formations of Germany.

Ecology
Like extant sirenians, Anomotherium was probably capable of feeding upon seagrasses, brown algae, and mollusks on the shallow seabead.

See also 
 Evolution of sirenians

References 

Oligocene sirenians
Chattian life
Rupelian life
Oligocene mammals of Europe
Paleogene Germany
Fossils of Germany
Fossil taxa described in 1965
Prehistoric placental genera